ZAP is a digital satellite television provider mainly for Portuguese-speaking countries in sub-Saharan Africa. ZAP launched in Angola in 2010, providing a subscription based TV service covering the sub-Saharan countries to south of Angola. ZAP operates from the Eutelsat W7 satellite, placed over Africa at 36,0 degrees East, broadcasting in DVB-S2 in five  transponders with MPEG-4 compression and Nagravision encryption.

ZAP provides an unprecedented number of Portuguese-language channels for a region where Portuguese-speaking African countries account for more than 40 million people.

In order to subscribe to ZAP's television service a subscriber can use either one of the two available decoders. The "HD+" decodes the encrypted signal, provides an electronic programming guide, high definition image and 5.1 stereo sound. The "HD+DVR" decoder provides the additional functionality of digital video recorder.

Channels
ZAP currently offers 150 channels, including several HDTV channels, featuring TV series, films, music, children's programmes, news, sports and documentaries. The subscribers may choose one of three tiered channel packages: "Mini" with 35 channels; "Max" with 80 channels; and "Premium" with 100 channels.
Additionally ZAP provides several radio channels.

References

External links
ZAP official homepage
Channel and transponder list

Direct broadcast satellite services
Mass media companies of Angola
Telecommunications companies of Angola
Companies based in Luanda
Telecommunications companies established in 2010